In mathematics, a perfect matrix is an m-by-n binary matrix that has no possible k-by-k submatrix K that satisfies the following conditions:

 k > 3
 the row and column sums of K are each equal to b, where b ≥ 2
 there exists no row of the (m − k)-by-k submatrix formed by the rows not included in K with a row sum greater than b.

The following is an example of a K submatrix where k = 5 and b = 2:

References 

Matrices